Hippotion dexippus is a moth of the family Sphingidae. It is known from dry areas in eastern Kenya.

References

 Pinhey, E. (1962): Hawk Moths of Central and Southern Africa. Longmans Southern Africa, Cape Town.

Hippotion
Moths described in 1915
Moths of Africa